Mechanic, mechanical, mechanician, or mechanics may refer to:

Professions
 Mechanic, a person who uses tools to fix and maintain machinery
 Aircraft Maintenance Technician, or aircraft mechanic, a person who repairs aircraft
 Auto mechanic, a person who repairs automobiles
 Card mechanic, a card cheat who specializes in sleight-of-hand manipulation of cards
 Hit man, or mechanic
Mechanician
An archaic term for a manual labourer, craftsman or artisan

People
 Bill Mechanic (born 1949), American film producer

Arts, entertainment, and media
 Mechanic (Transformers), a character in Marvel Comics' Transformers
 Mechanics (Aristotle), an Ancient Greek treatise on machines
 Game mechanics, constructs of rules or methods designed for interaction with the game state
 Mike + The Mechanics, British pop-rock band

Science and technology
 Mechanical engineering
 Mechanics, an area of science concerned with the behaviour of physical bodies when subjected to forces or displacements
 Mechanics' Institutes, institutions established to provide adult education, particularly scientific education, to the working classes

See also
Mechanical (disambiguation)
The Mechanic (disambiguation)
Mechanicus (disambiguation)

ru:Механик